Prakkulam is a village in Kollam district in the south west Indian state of Kerala. This village is the part of Thrikkaruva Grama Panchayat. In the 19th century, there were beaches in prakkulam for importing and exporting goods. This village is situated 12 km from Kollam junction railway station and 11 km from Kollam K.S.R.T.C Bus Station. Kollam Bypass, which connects National Highway 544 from Kavanad to Mevaram is passing through Prakkulam.

Sambranikkodi
Sambranikkodi is the southernmost point of Prakkulam. This place is situated in Ashtamudikayal. A Tourism circuit project is launched with the help of Central - State Governments from Sambranikkodi. The name Sambranikkodi is from the Chinese small ship Chambrani, which was anchored near this place in the 14th century.

Famous persons
Pranav Nair
Prakkulam Bhasi

Captain M.S.Pillai

Institutions
N.S.S.H.S.S Prakkulam

See also
Kollam
List of villages in India

References

Villages in Kollam district